Saint-Pantaléon-de-Lapleau (literally Saint-Pantaléon of Lapleau) is a commune in the Corrèze department in central France.

Geography
The Luzège forms part of the commune's southwestern boundary.

Population

See also
Communes of the Corrèze department

References

Communes of Corrèze